Bambuseria bambusifolia is a species of plant within the orchid family. It is native to Assam, China, India, Laos, Myanmar, Thailand, and Vietnam.

References

Eriinae
Flora of Assam (region)
Flora of China
Flora of India (region)
Flora of Laos
Flora of Myanmar
Flora of Thailand
Flora of Vietnam